The 1921 George Washington Hatchetites Colonials football team was an American football team that represented George Washington University as a member of the South Atlantic Intercollegiate Athletic Association during the 1921 college football season. In their first season under head coach William Quigley, the team compiled a 3–3–2 record.

Schedule

References

George Washington
George Washington Colonials football seasons
George Washington Hatchetites football